The men's 94 kg (206.8 lbs) Light-Contact category at the W.A.K.O. World Championships 2007 in Belgrade was the second heaviest of the male Light-Contact tournaments being the equivalent of super heavyweight in the Low-Kick and K-1 weight classes.  There were sixteen men taking part in the competition, all based in Europe.  Each of the matches was three rounds of two minutes each and were fought under Light-Contact rules.  

The tournament winner was Germany's Giovanni Nurchi who defeated Emin Panyan from Russia by split decision in the competitions final match to win the gold medal.  Defeated semi finalists Artem Vasylenko from the Ukraine and Slovenian Ranis Smajlovic were rewarded for their efforts by claiming the bronze medal spots.

Results

Key

See also
List of WAKO Amateur World Championships
List of WAKO Amateur European Championships
List of male kickboxers

References

External links
 WAKO World Association of Kickboxing Organizations Official Site

Kickboxing events at the WAKO World Championships 2007 Belgrade
2007 in kickboxing
Kickboxing in Serbia